Khaltmaagiin Battuul (born 03 March 1965) is a Mongolian wrestler. He competed in the men's freestyle 57 kg at the 1988 Summer Olympics.

References

1965 births
Living people
Mongolian male sport wrestlers
Olympic wrestlers of Mongolia
Wrestlers at the 1988 Summer Olympics
Place of birth missing (living people)